Ron Kampeas is the Washington, D.C. bureau chief of the Jewish Telegraphic Agency (JTA), "responsible for coordinating coverage in the U.S. capital and analyzing political developments that affect the Jewish world."

Career
In 1992 Kampeas joined The Associated Press in Jerusalem.  For over ten years, he worked at AP "in its bureaus in Jerusalem, New York, London and, most recently, Washington."  He also worked for The Jerusalem Post in Israel, which still publishes his work originating with the JTA, and for "several Jewish organizations."

He served as the Human Rights Coordinator for the News Media Guild. In Washington, he wrote articles about "discrimination in the U.S. government and military, and he "was also a shop steward for two years": "'I've always had a keen interest in diversity issues, and believe they are a crucial part of the Guild's mandate,'" he was quoted as stating in August 2003. Other places from which he has reported include Northern Ireland, Afghanistan, Bosnia, and West Africa.

He was made Washington bureau chief of the Jewish Telegraphic Agency in the summer of 2003.

Kampeas covers news pertaining to the Israeli–Palestinian conflict and the peace process relating to it, and he has spoken publicly about this subject in educational programs sponsored jointly by organizations like The Jerusalem Fund for Education and Community Development, at The Palestine Center.

Personal history
Kampeas was born and raised in Montreal.

Notes

Bibliography
Articles by Ron Kampeas archived by FindArticles.com.  Accessed March 26, 2007.
Articles by Ron Kampeas archived by JTA: Jewish Telegraphic Agency.  Accessed March 26, 2007.
Authors: Ron Kampeas.  Articles by Ron Kampeas archived in the New Jersey Jewish Standard.  Accessed March 26, 2007.
Documents.  Two articles by Ron Kampeas recommended by Campus Watch.  Accessed March 26, 2007.
"'Brain drain' Continues with AP Departures".  WiReport: A Publication of the News Media Guild Local 31222, The Newspaper Guild, CWA, AFL-CIO, CLC August 2003.  Accessed March 27, 2007.
Essing, David and Ron Kampeas.  "JTA: The View from JTA: Washington".  Windows Media Player audio interview of Kampeas conducted by Essing on IsraCast.  Online posting.  IsraCast: A Multimedia Broadcast and Distribution Network.  Broadcast April 16, 2004.  Accessed March 26, 2007.
Kampeas, Ron.  "Groups Fear Quagmire in Iraq Undermines the Resolve on Iran".  Jewish Telegraphic Agency March 1, 2007.  The Jewish Exponent March 22, 2007.  Accessed March 26, 2007.
–––, and Said Arikat.  "Politics and Perceptions of Peace: A Palestinian and Israeli Perspective".  Summary of a Lecture by Journalists Said Arikat and Ron Kampeas presented on June 14, 2005.  The Palestine Center of The Jerusalem Fund.  For the Record No. 228 (2nd of 4 in Series), 26 July 2005.  Accessed March 26, 2007
Recent articles by Ron Kampeas  archived in The Jewish Press.  2004–2007.  Accessed March 26, 2007.
"Ron Kampeas" Official staff biography featured on the website of the Jewish Telegraphic Agency

External links
"Capitol Currents: McNulty, What Were You Thinking?"  Jewish Telegraphic Agency, Blogs/Opinion.  Ron Kampeas's JTA blog.  Updated April 17, 2007.  Accessed April 17, 2007.

Year of birth missing (living people)
Living people
American male journalists